Kincardine Airport  is located  north-northeast of Kincardine, Ontario, Canada.

Kincardine Municipal Airport is a Transport Canada registered aerodrome north of the town of Kincardine on Highway 21.

The airport complex occupies , overlooking Lake Huron. It serves as a base for sightseeing, corporate jets, air ambulance services and recreational pilots, some of whom own private hangars on the airport grounds. There are two paved runways with a full ARCAL system along with NDB/DME and GPS LPV approaches.

References

External links
 Kincardine Airport website & webcams
 NAVCANADA weather cameras for CYKM
 Kincardine Airport page on COPA's Places to Fly

Kincardine, Ontario
Registered aerodromes in Ontario
Buildings and structures in Bruce County
Transport in Bruce County